Michael Lomonaco (born January 2, 1955) is an American chef, restaurateur, and television personality. He is best known as the chef/director for Windows on the World, the restaurant located atop the North Tower of the World Trade Center. The restaurant was destroyed in the September 11 attacks, and all of the staff members who were working in the restaurant at the time of the attack died. Lomonaco survived because he was in the tower's lobby during the attacks and was then evacuated from the building. He has rebounded with the opening of Porter House New York, which was named by Esquire one of America's Best New Restaurants in October 2006.

LeCirque and 21
An aspiring actor who cooked as a hobby, Lomonaco said that meeting Patrick Clark inspired him to become a chef. Lomonaco started his culinary education at the New York City College of Technology (City Tech), graduating from the Hotel and Restaurant Management program in 1984. He quickly rose to fame during the 1980s at New York's famed restaurant Le Cirque, working under renowned chefs Alain Sailhac and Daniel Boulud. Later that decade, Lomonaco moved on to another legendary New York institution, 21 Club. He revitalized the restaurant, known for its storied history as a Prohibition-era speakeasy and celebrity patrons, by revamping the menu by eliminating some old Continental standbys in favor of updated American fare. Lomonaco remained at 21 until 1996. While at the restaurant, he published a book of recipes from the restaurant.

Windows on the World

In 1997, Lomonaco took on the task of Executive Chef/Director for Windows on the World, located on the 106th and 107th floors of the North Tower of the World Trade Center in lower Manhattan. Again, he updated the menu from traditional French to modern American cuisine with great success. In response, the restaurant became one of America's highest grossing restaurants three years in a row. As executive director, Lomonaco was responsible for the main dining room, as well as the smaller Wild Blue restaurant, and the bar called The Greatest Bar on Earth.

Lomonaco was uninjured during the September 11 attacks as he was in the lobby of 1 World Trade Center having a pair of eyeglasses repaired at LensCrafters. The first plane crashed and he was evacuated from the lobby shortly afterwards.

After September 11, 2001
After the September 11, 2001 attacks, the day on which many of his friends and coworkers died, Lomonaco became a consulting chef to Noche, a multi-story restaurant and nightclub in midtown Manhattan highlighting the cuisines of Latin America and the Caribbean. Many former employees of Windows on the World also worked at this new venue along with Lomonaco when it debuted in 2002. However, Noche announced its closing in late 2004. He also served as a consultant for Guastavinos, a restaurant located under the Manhattan end of the Queensboro Bridge.

In 2006, Lomonaco opened Porter House New York, an American grill in the newly opened Time Warner Center on the Columbus Circle. The 250-seat restaurant with a view of Central Park South has garnered positive reviews for its contemporary American menu.

Television and media career
Before a culinary career, Lomonaco's goal was to be an actor, which he pursued for eight years. His training in this field has led the chef to combine his two passions in front of the camera. Lomonaco is the co-host of the Discovery Channel's program Epicurious. Previously he hosted Michael's Place on the Food Network for three years. He has also made appearances on talk shows and cooking programs such as In Julia's Kitchen with Master Chefs. He also guest starred in season five's episode of Anthony Bourdain's No Reservations, titled Disappearing Manhattan.

Lomonaco has also been a featured chef on Great Chefs television.

Lomonaco is a co-author of The 21 Cookbook, published by Doubleday in 1995, commemorating his recipes at the famed restaurant. In 2004, he released "Nightly Specials: 125 Recipes for Spontaneous, Creative Cooking at Home". He has written articles and recipes for many magazines, including New York magazine, Gourmet and Food & Wine.

Teaching and charity
When not in his restaurant, Michael Lomonaco can be found teaching future chefs at City University of New York and Institute of Culinary Education in Manhattan. He also makes appearances as a guest chef at the International Hotel Show, the Chicago Restaurant show and Festa Italiana Seattle.

After September 11, Lomonaco co-founded the Windows of Hope Family Relief Fund, in order to generate support for the families of all restaurant and food service workers lost in the attacks. He also participates in cooking events that benefit causes including the March of Dimes, City Harvest and Share Our Strength.

References

External links
Interview with Lomonaco, photos and video at Porter House
Porter House official website
Magazine review of Porter House by Esquire
Guastavino's website
Profile at Great Chefs

Living people
American chefs
American male chefs
1955 births
People from Brooklyn
Survivors of the September 11 attacks